The Apalachicola dusky salamander (Desmognathus apalachicolae) is a species of salamander in the family Plethodontidae. It is threatened by habitat loss.

Distribution
The species is endemic to Alabama, Florida, and Georgia, in the Southeastern United States. Its natural habitats are temperate forests, intermittent rivers, and freshwater springs.

References

Desmognathus
Salamander, Apalachicola
Salamander, Apalachicola
Salamander, Apalachicola
Taxonomy articles created by Polbot
Amphibians described in 1989